Sumner College is a private for-profit nursing school located in Portland, Oregon and Phoenix, Arizona. Offering Associate degrees in Nursing Licensed Practical Nursing, Medical Assisting, Certified Nursing Assisting and Phlebotomy Technician classes, the college operates three campuses, two in the Greater Portland, Oregon Metro area and one in the Greater Phoenix, Arizona Metro area Founded in 1974, academic programs have included health care, court reporting, and criminal justice.

History 
Sumner College began in 1974 with one campus located in Portland, the college began as The Court Reporting Institute. Founded by Bill Ellis, the school was located near Portland State University with the focus to train students to become proficient court reporters to support the legal community. In 1986, the college changed its name to the College of Legal Arts, and expanded its curriculum by adding a Legal Secretarial Program and in 1988 a Paralegal Program. In 1995 the school moved locations and added a Medical Transcription program, its first program in the medical field. In 2007 the college was purchased by Cascade Education, LLC. Under the new ownership the college began to develop new programs for the healthcare industry. In 2009, the college changed its name to Sumner College and launched its first nursing program. In 2012 the college was approved to offer an associate level Registered Nursing Program (AAS) by the state of Oregon and the Oregon State Board of Nursing, becoming the second proprietary school in the state. In 2019 Sumner College added a Medical Assisting program to meet local demand for healthcare. In 2020 Sumner College starting offering its first 100% online course in RN to BSN. Then in 2021 Sumner College expanded with the acquisition of East Valley Medical College in Phoenix, Arizona, adding healthcare programs for Certified Nursing Assisting and Phlebotomy Technician classes.

Campuses 
Sumner College has 2 locations in the Portland, Oregon and 1 location in the Phoenix, Arizona.

The Portland Sumner College Cascade Campus is located at 8338 NE Alderwood Rd. Suite #100 Portland, Oregon 97220. Cascade offers Registered Nursing, Practical Nursing and RN to BSN program.

The Portland Sumner College Annex is located at 7535 NE Ambassador PL | Suite L, Portland, OR 97220. The Sumner College Annex offers the Medical Assisting program.

The Arizona Sumner College campus is located at 205 East Southern Avenue, Mesa, AZ 85210. The Arizona campus offers Medical Assisting, Certified Nursing Assisting and Phlebotomy Technician programs. Sumner College Arizona was previously known as East Valley Medical College. In 2021 Sumner College purchased the school and in December 2021 officially changed the school name to Sumner College.

Accreditation
The nursing school is accredited by the Accrediting Council for Health Education Schools (ABHES) <ref>https://www.sumnercollege.edu/accreditation//ref>}
The RN to BSN (Bachelor of Science) degree is accredited by the Commission on Collegiate Nursing Education (CCNW). December 2021

References
https://www.sumnercollege.edu/accreditation/

External Links 

 Official website

Universities and colleges in Portland, Oregon
Educational institutions established in 1974
1974 establishments in Oregon